The Bella Lui is a mountain of the Bernese Alps, located north of Crans-Montana in the Swiss canton of Valais. A cable car station is located near the summit and, in winter, the mountain is part of ski area.

See also
List of mountains of Switzerland accessible by public transport

References

External links
 Bella Lui on Hikr

Mountains of the Alps
Mountains of Switzerland
Mountains of Valais
Two-thousanders of Switzerland